is a passenger railway station located in Iwatsuki-ku, Saitama, Japan, operated by the private railway operator Tōbu Railway. The station is numbered "TD-07".

Lines

Station layout
The station has one ground-level island platform serving two tracks. The station building is located above the platform.

Platforms

Adjacent stations

History
The station opened on 1 December 1969. The present station building was completed in 2006. From 17 March 2012, station numbering was introduced on the Tōbu Noda Line, with Higashi-Iwatsuki Station becoming "TD-07".

Passenger statistics
In fiscal 2019, the station was used by an average of 20,454 passengers daily.

Surrounding area
Site of Iwatsuki Castle
Higashi-Iwatsuki Post Office

See also
List of railway stations in Japan

References

External links

 Higashi-Iwatsuki Station information (Tobu) 

Railway stations in Saitama (city)
Railway stations in Japan opened in 1969
Tobu Noda Line
Stations of Tobu Railway